Gwede is an African given name and surname. Notable people with the name include:

Gwede Mantashe (born 1955), South African politician
Focus Gwede (died 2011), head of Malawi Police Force 

African given names
Surnames of African origin